Raymond Carver (born June 13, 1973 in Baltimore, Maryland) is a former American professional darts player who competed in the Professional Darts Corporation and is generally regarded as one of the top American darts players. He was nicknamed Razor and lives in Chicago, IL.

Career

Carver made his World Championship debut in the 2003 PDC World Darts Championship, losing 4–0 to Wayne Mardle in the qualifying round. His second World Championship appearance in the 2006 World Championship saw him defeating number three seed Ronnie Baxter in the first round. He lost in the second round to Andy Smith. In the 2008 PDC World Darts Championship, Carver suffered a first round exit to Wayne Mardle. He has also qualified for the Las Vegas Desert Classic in 2005, 2006 and 2007, reaching to quarter-finals in 2005 before losing to Wes Newton. Carver was one of the American qualifiers for the inaugural World Series of Darts but lost easily in the first round to Peter Manley.

World Championship Results

PDC

 2003: 1st Round (lost to Wayne Mardle 0–4)
 2006: 2nd Round (lost to Andy Smith 3–4)
 2008: 1st Round (lost to Wayne Mardle 2–3)

External links
 Ray Carver web site
 Ray Carver profile
 Darts Database

1973 births
American darts players
Living people
Sportspeople from Nashua, New Hampshire
British Darts Organisation players
Professional Darts Corporation former pro tour players